The San Marino national U-17 football team is the national under-17 football team of San Marino and is controlled by the San Marino Football Federation. The head coach is Pietro Rossi.

They have competed in the UEFA European Under-17 Championship qualifying rounds every year since 2003. They have so far played 44 official games with 40 defeats, three draws (against Andorra in 2012, Faroe Islands in 2005 and Armenia in 2015) and one victory (over Andorra, in 2002).

Competitive record

FIFA Under-17 World Cup Record
 1985-1991: Did not enter
 1993: Did not qualify
 1995: Did not enter
 1997-2019: Did not qualify
 2021: Cancelled
 2023: Did not qualify

UEFA U-16 Championship Record
 1982: Did not enter
 1984: Did not enter
 1985: Did not enter
 1986: Did not enter
 1987: Did not enter
 1988: Did not qualify
 1989: Did not enter
 1990: Did not qualify
 1991: Did not enter
 1992: Did not enter
 1993: Did not qualify
 1994: Did not enter
 1995: Did not enter
 1996: Did not enter
 1997: Did not qualify
 1998: Did not qualify
 1999: Did not qualify
 2000: Did not enter
 2001: Did not qualify

UEFA U-17 Championship Record
 2002: Did not enter
 2003-2019: Qualifying Round
 2020: Cancelled
 2021: Cancelled
 2022: Qualifying Round
 2023 : Qualifying Round

Current squad 
 The following players were called up for the 2023 UEFA European Under-17 Championship qualification.
 Match dates: 13–19 October 2022
 Opposition: ,  and Caps and goals correct as of:''' 26 October 2021, after the match against

References 

European national under-17 association football teams
Under 17